The Up All Night Tour was the first headlining concert tour by English-Irish boy band One Direction, in support of their debut studio album, Up All Night (2011). It began in December 2011 and was One Direction's first solo tour after being formed in the seventh series of The X Factor and being signed to Syco Records. The concert tour was announced in September 2011, with the initial dates for UK and Ireland being revealed. The tour eventually expanded to Oceania and North America, with the band playing 54 shows in total.

The setlist encompassed songs from One Direction's debut album and five covers. Critics commended One Direction's singing abilities and stage presence, and the production of the show. The tour was commercially successful, and a recording of the concert at the Bournemouth International Centre was made for Up All Night: The Live Tour, which was released on DVD in May 2012. The DVD was a commercial success, topping the charts in twenty-five countries, and made chart history in the US. By August 2012, the video album had sold in excess of one million copies worldwide.

Background
After being formed and finishing third in the seventh series of The X Factor in 2010, One Direction were signed to Syco Music. The group and nine other contestants from the series participated in The X Factor Live Tour 2011 from February 2011 to April 2011. The tour saw the group performing for 500,000 people throughout the UK. While performing on The X Factor Live Tour 2011 in April 2011, the group revealed that they would be embarking on a solo tour "soon".

One Direction's debut headline UK concert tour, the Up All Night Tour, was officially announced on 27 September 2011. Set for December 2011 and January 2012, the tour would showcase their then-upcoming debut album, and would commence on 18 December 2011 in Watford, England and end on 26 January 2012 in Belfast, Northern Ireland. One Direction announced the solo tour shortly after releasing their first single, "What Makes You Beautiful". Shows in the UK and Ireland were instant sell-outs causing additional shows to be added. In February 2012, One Direction announced the Oceania leg, with tour dates scheduled for April 2012, visiting Sydney, Brisbane, Melbourne, Auckland and Wellington. While promoting the tour, band member Liam Payne stated the group wanted this trek to be a "world tour". Once the first leg of the tour was complete, the band joined Big Time Rush as the opening act on the Better With U Tour.

During a break from concerts, One Direction promoted their album in the United States. Following an appearance on The Today Show, Up All Night was released in the US and One Direction became the first ever UK group to have their debut album bow atop the Billboard 200. This led to the group extending the tour into North America. On 21 March 2012, One Direction announced the North American leg of the tour. The North American leg would start on 24 May 2012 and comprise 26 shows. Shortly after, English singer-songwriter Olly Murs was confirmed to be the opening act for select dates on the tour.

Reception

Critical response 

The concerts in England and Ireland received mixed feedback from critics. Kitty Empire of The Observer was not impressed with the show at Windsor Hall. Empire wrote, "It's easy to sneer at boy bands, but always worth considering their appeal. It goes without saying that One Direction are slick, and often bland. With the exception of their persuasive No 1 single, "What Makes You Beautiful", their songs aren't wildly distinctive". For the concert at the HMV Hammersmith Apollo in London, James Robertson of Daily Mirror gave the band a positive review. He states, "The room shook with hair raising, ear drum piercing and (if there had been windows) glass-shattering screams. Each took a turn walking forward to embrace the cries from the sold-out Hammersmith Apollo while singing the lame-named Na, Na, Na. It was impossible to tell which one of the five boys had the biggest ovation but the loudest cheer came when Niall played acoustic guitar as they sang solo around an artificial camp fire". The show was positively reviewed by Alexandra Ryan of Evening Herald for the concert at Dublin's The O2. She says, "They came, they saw, they conquered. Dreams came true for thousands of Irish female fans as their pop idols One Direction took to the stage at the O2. Swarms of screaming girls flocked to the sold-out venue last night as Zayn, Harry, Louis, Liam and Mullingar teen Niall Horan performed for 14,000 fans".

As the tour progressed to Oceania and North America, many critics remarked on the band's popularity and their singing abilities. For the Sydney concert at Hordern Pavilion, Mike Wass from Idolator felt One Direction's "surprisingly accomplished effort" of Kings of Leon's "Use Somebody" proved that they are "more than capable" of evolving their sound. Cameron Adams of Herald Sun wrote a positive review for the concert in Melbourne at the Hisense Arena. He assessed that One Direction represented a "cleverly cast pop band with plenty of personality unleashed at the perfect time and seizing their moment." He opined that the covers performed showcased "strong pop voices." Adams concluded as follows: "Who knows if they'll progress beyond the usual boy band lifespan. But for now they're making a lot of people very happy." Reviewing the concert in Fairfax at the Patriot Center, Chris Richards of The Washington Post wrote: "Over the course of umpteen songs, its members didn't work the stage so much as loiter on it. They looked comfortable. No silly choreography, just a few ensemble fist-pumps. No ridiculous costumes, just letterman jackets, cardigans and khakis. A no-nonsense backing band — guitar, bass, keyboards and drums — provided steady renditions of nearly all of the songs on the group's debut album, "Up All Night", as well as a few covers, including Kings of Leon's "Use Somebody" and Natalie Imbruglia's "Torn."

Lars Brandle of Billboard reviewed the concert at the BBEC Great Hall in Brisbane. Brandle predominantly noted the band's popularity: "To say 1D is the hottest boy-band on the scene, doesn't quite grasp the situation. "On fire" is closer to the mark." Brandle commended the show for being "all slick, clean fun". Erica Futterman of Rolling Stone highlighted the group's acoustic performances, which "showed off Horan's ability to play guitar, as well as One Direction's admirable live vocals". Futterman concluded that there "was no need to worry about a backing track or a bum note, a pleasant realisation at a pop show". Jane Stevenson from Canoe.ca maintained that the show at the Molson Canadian Amphitheatre in Toronto had "none of that choreographed dance move nonsense", and complimented the "naturally, classy, low-key" production. Melody Lau of National Post reviewed the same concert. Lau opined, "It's easy to get lost in inherent appeal of their perfectly coiffed dos and almost-too-put-together preppy style but somewhere in the midst of all the love-struck squeals of teenage girls are guys who can actually sing and, to a certain extent, entertain." Lau additionally noted One Direction's lack of original material to perform, "the group falls back on a handful of covers to fill in their set, including Kings of Leon's "Use Somebody", Gym Class Heroes' "Stereo Hearts" and, surprisingly, Natalie Imbruglia's "Torn". Not straying too far away from the originals, the mid-show medley definitely felt like the boys randomly belting out songs for the sake of filler but girls didn't mind."

Commercial performance 
When tickets for the shows in the UK and Ireland went on sale, concerts reportedly became sell-outs within minutes. It was reported nearly 10,000 tickets were sold in 10 minutes for the band's shows in Auckland and Wellington. The sellout success continued in Australia. There, the band's shows in Sydney, Melbourne and Brisbane sold out in three minutes. Shows in the United States also sold out within minutes.

Recording

A recording of the Up All Night Tour was filmed during One Direction's 3 January 2012 show at the International Centre in Bournemouth. Documenting the whole concert with intersperses of backstage footage, a video album, Up All Night: The Live Tour, was released on DVD in May 2012. The video concert DVD topped the charts in twenty-five countries. In Australia, it debuted at number one on the ARIA DVD chart and was certified six times platinum by the Australian Recording Industry Association (ARIA) for shipments of 90,000 units in its first week of sale. In the United States, it debuted at number one on the Billboard DVD chart, selling 76,000 copies, surpassing sales of the Billboard 200 number one album, John Mayer's Born and Raised, which sold 65,000 copies. One Direction made US chart history as the feat marks the first time a music DVD outsold the Billboard 200 number one album. The opening sales also makes it the highest music DVD debut of 2012 and the second highest debut in the past five years behind Adele's Live at the Royal Albert Hall, which launched at number one in December 2011, with 96,000 copies. As of August 2012, the video album had sold in excess of 1 million copies worldwide. In the week ending 27 January 2013, Up All Night: The Live Tour claimed its 30th week on top the Top Music Videos Chart, which is longer than any other title since the chart originated in March 1995. It surpassed Ray Stevens' Comedy Video Classics, which logged 29 weeks on top in 1993–1994. The recording was ultimately certified five times platinum by the Recording Industry Association of America (RIAA) on 29 May 2013, indicating shipments of 500,000 copies.

Opening acts
 Boyce Avenue (United Kingdom & Ireland)
 Camryn (North America, select dates)
 Justice Crew (Australia)
 Matt Lonsdale (United Kingdom & Ireland)
Annah Mac (New Zealand)
 Manika (North America, select dates) 
 Olly Murs (North America, select dates)
 Johnny Ruffo (Australia)

Setlist

 "Na Na Na"
 "Stand Up"
 "I Wish"
 Medley: "I Gotta Feeling" / "Stereo Hearts" / "Valerie" / "Torn"
 "Moments"
 "Gotta Be You"
 "More than This"
 "Up All Night"
 "Tell Me a Lie"
 "Everything About You"
 "Use Somebody"
 "One Thing"
 "Save You Tonight"
 "What Makes You Beautiful"
Encore
 "I Want"

Tour dates

Cancelled shows

Box office score data

Credits and personnel 
Credits taken and adapted from Official Tour Programme.

Band
Niall Horan 
Liam Payne 
Harry Styles 
Louis Tomlinson 
Zayn Malik 
Jon Shone (MD/keys)
Sandy Beales (bass)
Josh Devine (drums)
Dan Richards (guitar)

Management
Richard Griffiths
Harry Magee
Will Bloomfield
Chloe Fyffe

Show
Louise Doyle (show creative director)
Paul Roberts (choreographer)
Helene Horlyck (vocal coach)
Andy Saunders (video director/production)
Tom Bairstow (video production)
Rob Derbyshire (video soundtracks)
Matt English (show graphic designer)
Rob Arbuckle (screen 3D visualisations)
Caroline Watson (costume stylist)
Lydia Taylor (costume assistant)
Crystabel Riley (groomer)
Louise Teasdale (groomer)
Mike Clegg (production manager)
Mil Rakic (stage manager)
Paul Higgins (tour manager)
Namia Miller (security)
Preston Mahon (security)
Jag Chagger (security)
Karen Ringland (band chaperone)
June Jones (tour accountant)

References

External links

 

2011 concert tours
2012 concert tours
One Direction concert tours